The men's track time trial at the 1956 Summer Olympics in Melbourne, Australia, was held on Thursday 6 December 1956. There were 22 participants from 22 nations. Each competitor rode singly against the watch from a standing start. Competitors were allowed one ride only. The event was won by Leandro Faggin of Italy, the nation's first victory in the men's track time trial. Ladislav Fouček earned Czechoslovakia's first medal in the event with his silver, while Alfred Swift gave South Africa its second consecutive bronze medal.

Background

This was the seventh appearance of the event, which had previously been held in 1896 and every Games since 1928. It would be held every Games until being dropped from the programme after 2004. There were two returning cyclists from the 1952 Games: twelfth-place finisher Ladislav Fouček of Czechoslovakia and seventeenth-place finisher Hernán Masanés of Chile. Leandro Faggin of Italy was the amateur world record holder.

Brazil, Colombia, and Vietnam each made their debut in the men's track time trial. France and Great Britain each made their seventh appearance, having competed at every appearance of the event.

Competition format

The event was a time trial on the track, with each cyclist competing separately to attempt to achieve the fastest time. Each cyclist raced one kilometre from a standing start.

Records

The following were the world and Olympic records prior to the competition.

Leandro Faggin broke the Olympic record with a time of 1:09.8. Nobody else was able to surpass the old record time.

Schedule

All times are Australian Eastern Standard Time (UTC+10)

Results

Fouček was the first rider to go. He set a difficult pace, with the second-best Olympic performance yet of 1:11.4 after Russell Mockridge's 1952 record of 1:11.1. The next 15 riders all failed to match Fouček, but Faggin (who held the world record of 1:09.2) beat him by over a second and a half. The new Olympic record set by Faggin was 1:09.8; none of the five remaining riders came close.

References

External links
 Official Report

Cycling at the 1956 Summer Olympics
Cycling at the Summer Olympics – Men's track time trial
Track cycling at the 1956 Summer Olympics